Ditylus is a genus of false blister beetles in the family Oedemeridae. There are at least four described species in Ditylus.

Species
These four species belong to the genus Ditylus:
 Ditylus caeruleus (Randall, 1838) i c g b
 Ditylus gracilis LeConte, 1854 i c g b
 Ditylus laevis (Fabricius, 1787) g
 Ditylus quadricollis (LeConte, 1851) i c g b
Data sources: i = ITIS, c = Catalogue of Life, g = GBIF, b = Bugguide.net

References

Further reading

 
 
 
 
 
 
 
 

Oedemeridae
Articles created by Qbugbot